Iron Horse Trail may refer to:

 Iron Horse Trail, Alberta, in Canada
 Iron Horse Trail, Ontario, in Canada
 Iron Horse Trail (Montgomery County, Ohio): See 
 Iron Horse Trail (Stark County, Ohio): See 
 Iron Horse Trail, Pennsylvania, in the Tuscarora State Forest
 Iron Horse Regional Trail, in the San Francisco Bay Area in California
 Iron Horse State Park in Washington, United States, also known as the Iron Horse Trail